Mikhail “Misha” Malyshev is founder and CEO of Teza Group, a quantitative trading firm based in Chicago, Illinois.

Education
Misha Malyshev attended the Moscow Institute of Physics and Technology, earning a B.S. in physics and an M.S. in Theoretical Physics. After coming to the United States, Malyshev earned a Ph.D. from Princeton University in Astrophysics in 1998.

Career
Malyshev began his career in 1998 at Bell Laboratories conducting research until 2000. He spent the next three years as a consultant with McKinsey & Company. In 2003, he joined Citadel Investment Group and developed a quantitative trading business within the Quantitative Analytics group. He was appointed to the position of Managing Director and Global Head of High Frequency Trading; under his direction, the group made $1 billion in 2008. He resigned in 2009 and started his own firm. The move prompted Citadel to file a lawsuit in which Malyshev was required to pay a fine.

Malyshev founded Teza Group and its affiliate Teza Technologies in 2009. He serves as CEO of the firm. He would later establish Teza Capital Management LLC, a registered investment advisor.

Malyshev has also served as a contributing author to Smart Business Chicago.

Philanthropy
Misha Malyshev is a donor and sponsor for the Adler Planetarium. He serves on the board of directors of After-School All-Stars and is on the advisory board of After School Matters. He is a member of the global leadership council for buildOn,  where he has contributed money to fund the building of schools in developing countries.

References

Princeton University alumni
Year of birth missing (living people)
Living people
Russian physicists
Moscow Institute of Physics and Technology alumni